Discoteuthis discus is a species of squids in the family Cycloteuthidae. They occur in the tropical and subtropical Atlantic Ocean and the central North Pacific. While mature specimens have not been found, the unnamed species Discoteuthis sp. A has been hypothesised as the mature form.

References

External links 
Tree of Life web project: Discoteuthis discus

Squid
Molluscs described in 1969